High Wire is an album by the American jazz saxophonist Rob Brown, recorded in 1993 and released on the Italian Soul Note label. It features a trio with bassist William Parker and drummer Jackson Krall playing all original Brown compositions.

Reception

In his review for AllMusic, Brian Olewnick states: "Brown shows himself in full command of his horn and if, ultimately, High Wire is more a free blowing session than an exposition of ideas (the tunes are a bit sketchy and perfunctory), it's a solid, enjoyable one that fans of the downtown New York scene will want to own." The Penguin Guide to Jazz states: "The lider is in impressive form, with a further roster of fiery and more emotive pieces." In a double review for the Chicago Reader, Peter Margasak describes the album as superb, writing that "Brown is a magnificent hornman who's worked with adventurous musicians like pianist Matthew Shipp and guitarist Joe Morris, but he remains largely unknown."

Track listing
All compositions by Rob Brown
 "Hex Key" – 11:54
 "Totter" – 7:39 
 "Revealing" – 7:38 
 "Just a Touch" – 11:51 
 "Turmoil" – 10:31
 "Trickster" – 9:51

Personnel
Rob Brown – alto sax
William Parker – bass
Jackson Krall – drums

References

1996 albums
Rob Brown (saxophonist) albums
Black Saint/Soul Note albums